CoG may refer to:

 Center of gravity
 Central of Georgia Railway
 Choice of Games
 Continuity of Government
 Covenant of the Goddess
 Center of government

See also 
 Cog (disambiguation)